The Westervelt House is in Tenafly, New Jersey. The name may also refer to:

Benjamin P. Westervelt House, in Cresskill, New Jersey
Caspar Westervelt House, in Teaneck, New Jersey
Demott–Westervelt House, in Englewood, New Jersey; see National Register of Historic Places listings in Bergen County, New Jersey
John Westervelt House, in Harrington Park, New Jersey; see National Register of Historic Places listings in Bergen County, New Jersey
Peter Westervelt House and Barn, in Englewood, New Jersey
Westervelt–Ackerson House, in Ramsey, New Jersey
Westervelt–Cameron House, in Ridgewood, New Jersey
Westervelt–Lydecker House, in Woodcliff Lake, New Jersey

See also
William Westerfeld House, in San Francisco, California

Buildings and structures disambiguation pages